A leadership election for KDU-ČSL was held on 23 April 2022 after 2021 Czech legislative election. Marian Jurečka was reelected for second term.

Voting
Election was held on 23 April 2022. Jurečka was the only candidate. He received 224 votes of 275. 30 delegates abstained, 14 voted against while, 7 votes were invalid.

References

KDU-ČSL leadership elections
2022 elections in the Czech Republic
Indirect elections
KDU-ČSL leadership election